Elections in Liechtenstein take place at a national level within a multi-party system, with two dominant political parties. The Landtag of Liechtenstein has 25 members, elected for a four-year term by proportional representation in two multi-seat constituencies.

The country became a democracy in 1984 when it replaced universal male suffrage with universal suffrage, following a national referendum.

Electoral process
A variation of the standard party-list proportional format is used to elect 15 members from the district of Oberland and 10 members from the district of Unterland. The highest-remainder method dictates each party’s seat total in a district based on their vote share (which will be covered in more detail) there. Elections in these two districts are essentially separate, and the individual municipal divisions technically play no role in determining the eventual winners.

There are four parties currently registered in Liechtenstein: the Progressive Citizen’s Party (FBP), Patriotic Union (VU), the Independents (DU), and Free List (FL). Each party may nominate as many candidates in a district as can be elected there (15 available for Oberland and 10 for Unterland). Voters are assigned voting locations (either Oberland or Unterland district) based on their living. When voting, each voter must choose one party but is allowed to select as many candidates as they like (but only up to the maximum given: 15 candidate votes per Oberland voter and 10 candidate votes for each Unterland voter).

Any ballots without a single party mark at the top are considered void, but will be accepted no matter how many candidates are chosen. If more candidates are chosen than the limit, the candidates following the fifteenth (if in Oberland) or tenth (if in Unterland) are ignored and only the first 15 (Oberland) or 10 (Unterland) distinct choices will count. If the name of a candidate is repeated, only in the first instance where the candidate is named is taken into consideration and all subsequent mentions are ignored.

Although the number of candidates selected by each voter can vary and is up to their own determination, Oberland voters still must cast 15 total votes, and Unterland voters always give 10. The difference is made through the candidate rankings, which will be discussed later. Each candidate that is chosen by a voter counts as a vote for that candidate’s party. Each remaining vote out of the 15 (for Oberland) or 10 (for Unterland) corresponding to the number of candidates not chosen counts as a vote for the party initially specified by the voter.

For example, if a voter from Oberland chooses the FBP as their party of choice, and then chooses 4 candidates from the VU, 2 candidates from the FBP, and 1 candidate from the DU, then the party votes that this voter has cast are 4 for the VU, 1 for the DU, and 10 for the FBP (by virtue of the 2 votes for candidates from this party and the 8 remaining, empty candidate votes). Likewise, if an Unterland voter chooses DU as their party of choice, then casts 18 votes for the same FBP candidate and a vote for each of 2 VU candidates, then this voter’s party votes are counted as 1 for the FBP (since only 1 FBP candidate was selected), 2 for the VU, and 7 for the DU due to the 7 remaining candidate votes.

Note that it is impossible for a voter to cast votes for any party other than the one listed at the top of their ballot without selecting the requisite number of candidates from that party. This has been criticized by some as restricting the freedom of voters to choose multiple parties while refraining from supporting at least 1 particular candidate.

Also keep in mind that a maximum of 1 vote can be cast for each candidate by a single voter, and thus it would be impossible for a given voter to cast multiple votes for a single candidate. Especially because parties may not nominate a full slate in a given district since the party usually desires maximum influence on the candidates elected and because it is unlikely for the party to win a very large majority of seats that they had not anticipated, voters who support just one party have complained that their influence is diminished because they can only support the candidates their party has nominated and thus their remaining votes would only count as party votes and not also candidate votes.

Additionally as fact, the expected transition by Liechtenstein authorities to new, electronic voting machines could eliminate the possibility of a voter selecting too many candidates, especially if mistakenly believing that they would all be counted and being told that they could only vote for 15 in the Oberland and 10 in the Unterland. The party choice for each voter does not matter if the voter chooses the maximum number of candidates that they are allowed (15 in Oberland and 10 in Unterland) but makes a difference of one party vote if they leave one candidate choice blank, and it counts as two party votes if two are unchecked.

Once the number of seats for each party in every district has been determined by the party vote count in that district, the corresponding candidates of that party with the highest number of votes are elected. For example, if the VU is given three seats in Unterland, then the 3 most popular VU candidates in Unterland are elected as the 3 representatives of the VU from the Unterland, regardless of how many votes these candidates garnered in relation to candidates from other parties.

If a party is given more seats in a district than the number of candidates that it has nominated there, then the extra seats are redistributed to the other parties as if the party of concern had not received that many votes also by using the Hare quota. In this case, the maximum number of seats that this party can earn in the relevant district is also equivalent to the total candidates it has nominated there.

It is important to note that votes for a party and votes for candidates are separate and affect the count differently: as explained above, party votes are used only for determining the number of seats given to a party in each district, while candidate votes determine which candidates from a party win election from each district, this value corresponding to the number of seats that the party in question receives as determined in the previous step.

This is also why the two districts are not compared outside of the separate elections: Oberland voters get 15 votes each and Unterland voters 10 votes, which would distort support if a party’s vote share is different between the two districts. However, this is evened out because the seats are determined by district, and therefore both districts are approximately equally represented since the ratio of seats between them must be roughly proportional to their population difference.

General election results
The following graph depicts general election results since the introduction of the proportional representation system in 1945:

See also
Electoral calendar
Electoral system

References

External links
Adam Carr's Election Archive
Parties and elections